Amorbia monteverde is a species of moth of the family Tortricidae. It is found from Costa Rica to Veracruz in Mexico, where it is found at altitudes between 1,000 and 1,650 meters.

The length of the forewings is 8–8.4 mm for males and 10.2–11.2 mm for females. The ground colour of the forewings is light brown, with darker subbasal, median, and subterminal fascia. The hindwings are white with scattered brown scaling. There are multiple generations per year.

Etymology
The species name refers to the locality where the holotype and most of the material examined was collected: Monteverde in Puntarenas, Costa Rica.

References

Moths described in 2007
Sparganothini
Moths of Central America